Sukces ("Success") is Czesław Niemen's second solo album, released in 1968. The album was recorded with the band Akwarele.

Track listing 
 "Płonąca stodoła" – 2:32 (music Czesław Niemen, lyrics Marta Bellan)
 "Gdzie się mak czerwieni" – 2:42 (music Czesław Niemen, lyrics Andrzej Tylczyński)
 "Włóczęga" – 2:32 (music Czesław Niemen, lyrics Marta Bellan)
 "Narodziny miłości" – 2:37 (music Czesław Niemen, lyrics Marek Gaszyński)
 "Allilah" – 2:50 (music Czesław Niemen, lyrics Marek Gaszyński)
 "Najdłuższa noc" – 2:07 (music Czesław Niemen, lyrics Marta Bellan)
 "Sukces" – 3:14 (music and lyrics Czesław Niemen)
 "Jeżeli" – 2:23 (music Czesław Niemen, lyrics Julian Tuwim)
 "Spiżowy krzyk" – 2:14 (music Czesław Niemen, lyrics Czesław Niemczuk)
 "Tyle jest dróg" – 3:32 (music Czesław Niemen, lyrics Piotr Janczerski)
 "Niepotrzebni" – 2:48 (music Marian Zimiński, lyrics Marek Gaszyński)
 "Klęcząc przed Tobą" – 3:19 (music Czesław Niemen, lyrics Marek Gaszyński)

Personnel 
Czesław Niemen – vocal, organ
Zbigniew Sztyc – tenor saxophone
Tomasz Buttowtt – drums
Tomasz Jaśkiewicz – guitar
Ryszard Podgórski – trumpet
Marian Zimiński – piano, organ
Tadeusz Gogosz – bass

References

Czesław Niemen albums
1968 albums
Polish-language albums
Polskie Nagrania Muza albums